Burneo’s Oldfield mouse (Thomasomys burneoi) is a species of sigmodontine rodent in the family Cricetidae known from Sangay National Park in the eastern Andes, central Ecuador. The species is named after Ecuadorian mammalogist .

See also

 List of mammals of Ecuador

References

Thomasomys
Endemic fauna of Ecuador
Mammals of Ecuador
Mammals described in 2022